Metarhizium robertsii  formerly known as M. anisopliae, and even earlier as Entomophthora anisopliae (basionym)  is a fungus that grows naturally in soils throughout the world and causes disease in various insects by acting as a parasitoid.  Ilya I. Mechnikov named it after the insect species from which it was originally isolated – the beetle Anisoplia austriaca. It is a mitosporic fungus with asexual reproduction, which was formerly classified in the form class Hyphomycetes of the phylum Deuteromycota (also often called Fungi Imperfecti).

Many isolates have long been recognised to be specific, and they were assigned variety status, but they have now been assigned as new Metarhizium species, such as M. robertsii, M. majus and M. acridum (which was M. anisopliae var. acridum and included the isolates used for locust control).  Metarhizium taii was placed in M. anisopliae var. anisopliae, but has now been described as a synonym of M. guizhouense (see Metarhizium).  The commercially important isolate M.a. 43 (or F52, Met52, etc.), which infects Coleoptera and other insect orders has now been assigned to Metarhizium brunneum. M. anisopliae has since been renamed M. robertsii, renamed in honor of Donald W. Roberts, who did his Ph.D. on this species, and has continued to work with it prolifically as a research professor ever since.

Biology
The disease caused by the fungus is sometimes called green muscardine disease because of the green colour of its spores. When these mitotic (asexual) spores (called conidia) of the fungus come into contact with the body of an insect host, they germinate and the hyphae that emerge penetrate the cuticle. The fungus then develops inside the body, eventually killing the insect after a few days; this lethal effect is very likely aided by the production of insecticidal cyclic peptides (destruxins). The cuticle of the cadaver often becomes red. If the ambient humidity is high enough, a white mould then grows on the cadaver that soon turns green as spores are produced. Most insects living near the soil have evolved natural defenses against entomopathogenic fungi like M. robertsii. This fungus is, therefore, locked in an evolutionary battle to overcome these defenses, which has led to a large number of isolates (or strains) that are adapted to certain groups of insects.

Economic importance
The previously described range of entomopathogenic fungus isolates known as M. anisopliae, before 2009, had been observed to infect over 200 insect pest species.  M. robertsii and its related species are used as biological insecticides to control a number of pests such as termites, thrips, etc. and its use in the control of malaria-transmitting mosquitoes is under investigation.  M. robertsii does not appear to infect humans but has been reported as a significant pathogen of reptiles. The microscopic spores are typically sprayed on affected areas. A possible technique for malaria control is to coat mosquito nets or cotton sheets attached to the wall with them.

In August 2007, a team of scientists at the Indian Institute of Chemical Technology discovered a more efficient way of producing biodiesel which uses lipase, an enzyme produced in significant quantities by M. robertsii, as opposed to other reactions which use enzymes that require heat  to become active; the reaction that uses lipase runs at room temperature. The fungus is now a candidate for mass production of the enzyme.

A simplified method of microencapsulation has been demonstrated to increase the shelf-life of M. robertsii spores commercialised for biological control of pest insects, potentially increasing its efficiency against red imported fire ants.

M. Robertsii has been shown to break down very toxic mercury into less toxic forms of mercury. According to doi: 10.1073/pnas.2214513119

Important isolates

 The ex-neotype isolate of M. robertsii is IMI 168777ii = ARSEF 7487 (also CSIRO FI-1029) from Schistocerca gregaria in Eritrea
 A.C. Rath's isolate F506 (= ARSEF 4556; DAT 506; IMI 384583) from Boophilus sp. (Acari: Ixodidae) in USA (Florida)
 M. robertsii isolated from Dermolepida albohirtum (Coleoptera: Scarabaeidae) include: CSIRO FI-1358 (= ARSEF 7493) and FI 1045 which is the active ingredient of 'Biocane'.

See also
 Beauveria bassiana, the fungus that causes white muscardine disease in various insects
 LUBILOSA

References

External links
 Index Fungorum record, links to a list of synonyms
  Fungi Make Biodiesel Efficiently at Room Temperature

Clavicipitaceae
Parasitic fungi
Fungi described in 1879